William M. Brewer (died September 12, 1921) served as mayor of Omaha, Nebraska from 1873 to 1874. Before his election, Brewer ran a liquor manufacturing business. As mayor, Brewer focused on using the police to cut down the crime rate. Brewer resigned two months before the close of his term. He is buried in Prospect Hill Cemetery in Omaha.

References

External links

Year of birth missing
1921 deaths
Mayors of Omaha, Nebraska
Burials at Prospect Hill Cemetery (North Omaha, Nebraska)